The Cuckoo Clocks of Hell is the thirteenth studio album by American guitarist Buckethead. It was released on April 20, 2004 via Disembodied Records.

Track listing

Spokes for the Wheel of Torment

"Spokes for the Wheel of Torment" is the second song from the album and one of a few that have a music video (the others are "The Ballad of Buckethead" from the album Monsters and Robots, "We Are One" from Buckethead's 2005 album Enter the Chicken, "Pyrrhic Victory" by Thanatopsis, and "Viva Voltron", for the animated series Voltron).

Music video

The music video was directed by Syd Garon and Eric Henry featuring additional artwork by longtime Buckethead collaborator Bryan "Frankenseuss" Theiss. The video is based on the famous triptychs by Hieronymus Bosch, The Garden of Earthly Delights, The Last Judgement, the Paradise and Hell, and The Temptation of St. Anthony.

The music video starts showing a place that looks like hell where Buckethead has a lute and is carried by a flying beast which releases him. Buckethead ends in the hands of the "Prince of Hell" from The Garden of Earthly Delights triptych.

Buckethead gets eaten by the creature and his head, the lute and the two arms fall, getting themselves stuck on a tree where Buckethead starts to play a part of the song. While he plays, a lot of people getting killed are shown in several ways and a bird is picking body parts. Then the "Tree Man" from the same triptych is shown and the camera changes to the upper part of the triptych where all is on fire.

Buckethead keeps playing and when the song finishes the screen goes black and the credits appear showing the triptychs by Hieronymus Bosch. After the credits the camera pulls to show the credits were on a circular shape. During this time, parts of the song "Traveling Morgue" from the same album are played. The screen goes black again and the words "Beware, Beware, God Sees" appear.

The clip was shown at some film festivals around the world, such as the Sydney Film Festival, amongst others.

The music video has been officially made available in 2006, as part of the Anxious Animation DVD release as well as Buckethead's own video compilation Secret Recipe.

Personnel

Performers
Buckethead — acoustic guitar, electric guitar, bass guitar
Brain — drums, percussion

Production
Dan Monti — producer, engineer, mixing, programming
Robert Hadley - mastering
Bryan Theiss - artwork
P-Sticks - artwork (back cover, inside portrait of library)
Steven Morrison - title inspiration

References

Buckethead albums
2004 albums